Mary Elizabeth McGlynn Blum (born October 16, 1966) is an American voice actress, ADR director and singer best known for her involvement in music production in multiple games from the Silent Hill series, and her extensive English-language dubbing of various anime, animated films, and video games, including the critically acclaimed English adaptation of the television series Cowboy Bebop.

Career
McGlynn's voice roles in anime include Lieutenant Matilda in the 1981 film Mobile Suit Gundam I, Motoko Kusanagi from Ghost in the Shell: Stand Alone Complex, Kurenai Yuhi, Mei Terumi, Katsuyu and Koharu Utatane from the Naruto series, Cornelia li Britannia from Code Geass and the most recent role of Queen Metalia on Sailor Moon Crystal. She also does voice acting in video games such as Maria and Mary Shepherd-Sunderland in the HD collection version of Silent Hill 2 and Nina Williams from the Tekken series. She also works in cartoons as she voiced Dr. Maheswaran in Steven Universe and voice directed Penn Zero: Part-Time Hero. McGlynn also contributed to the Silent Hill movie adaptation and Dance Dance Revolution EXTREME. She has also had several movie roles. From 2015 to 2017, she was also a guest star for a Dungeons and Dragons web series titled Critical Role (15 Episodes).

She was a Guest of Honor at Anime Expo 2007, Long Beach.

McGlynn won the 2007 American Anime Award for Best Actress for her role as Major Motoko Kusanagi in Ghost in the Shell: Stand Alone Complex. She won a Society for the Promotion of Japanese Animation (SPJA) award in 2008 for Best Director for her work on Naruto.

Personal life
McGlynn was married to actor Daran Norris, but divorced him in 2012. She is currently married to voice actor Steve Blum. She has an identical twin sister named Melissa.

Filmography

Anime

Animation

Film

Video games

Live action

Notes

References

External links

 
 
 
 Mary Elizabeth McGlynn, Melissa Williamson at Crystal Acids Voice Actor Database
 
 
 Digipedia Interview with Mary Elizabeth McGlynn

1966 births
Living people
American women rock singers
American film actresses
American television actresses
American video game actresses
American voice actresses
American casting directors
Women casting directors
American voice directors
Actresses from Los Angeles
Silent Hill
20th-century American actresses
20th-century American women singers
21st-century American actresses
21st-century American women singers

20th-century American singers
21st-century American singers
American twins